Brian Lewis (born 24 March 1942) is an Australian former sailor. He competed in the Tornado event at the 1976 Summer Olympics.

References

External links
 
 
 

1942 births
Living people
Australian male sailors (sport)
Olympic sailors of Australia
Sailors at the 1976 Summer Olympics – Tornado
Place of birth missing (living people)